Tannahill may refer to:

 Jordan Tannahill, Canadian playwright and filmmaker
 Mary Tannahill, (1863-1951) American artist
 Reay Tannahill, author of Food in History (1973) and other works
 Robert Tannahill (1774 — 1810), Scottish poet
 The Tannahill Weavers, traditional Scottish musical group active since 1968

See also
 Tannehill (disambiguation)